The  is a supermini/subcompact hatchback or a mini MPV manufactured and marketed worldwide by Nissan. Introduced in 2004, the first-generation Note was primarily marketed in Japan and Europe, and was produced in Japan and the United Kingdom. The second-generation model was sold in other regions, including North America where it was manufactured in Mexico and marketed as the Versa Note, and Thailand, where it serves as one of the B-segment hatchback offered by the brand alongside the smaller March/Micra under the Eco Car tax scheme.

In 2017, the second-generation Note was replaced by the French-built K14 Micra for the European market. The Versa Note was discontinued in North America in 2019 due to the decreasing demand for subcompact hatchbacks in the region. It continued to be produced and sold in Japan up to the introduction of the third-generation Note in late 2020.

The Note was introduced with a series hybrid drivetrain in late 2016 as the Note e-Power. Due to its popularity and the push of electrification, the third-generation Note is only available with the e-Power drivetrain.

First generation (E11; 2004)

Tone concept (2004) 
Nissan Note was developed to replace the unpopular Almera Tino which has proved to be a failure in Europe, with only 200,000 cars sold in 7 years. The main rival of Almera Tino, Renault Scénic, had 1,400,000 cars sold just in two years after the introduction of the second-generation model. Renault will later also introduce their mini-MPV named Modus, which will also become best-seller by late 2005. The development of what would become Note started around summer 2002. As a result, the Nissan Tone concept was created. It was unveiled at the 2004 Paris Motor Show. While similar to production model in general, the concept has some unique features such as U-shaped panoramic roof, and a large dashboard screen inside. The concept was equipped with automatic gearbox and always had it's rear doors locked. Chris Lee, Nissan's product manager, says that many millions of dollars were invested in development and that Note was meant to be sold with pricetag under €13,000.

Production model (2005) 
The production version was unveiled in December 2004, and went on sale on 20 January 2005 in Japan. The European model was unveiled at the 2005 Frankfurt Motor Show, followed by the 2006 Geneva Motor Show. Retail models went on sale in Europe in early 2006. The United Kingdom was the first market to have the Note launch, being released on 1 March 2006. The car shares some of its underpinnings with the Renault Modus, and manufactured at Nissan's plant in Washington, England. Early models included a choice of four engines, which are 1.4-litre and 1.6-litre petrol; and two options of 1.5-litre diesel. It is an indirect successor to the conventional medium-sized Almera hatchback for the region.

The trim levels for the European market were the S, SE and SVE, while later it is replaced by Visia, Visia+, Acenta, Acenta R and Tekna. In Russia/CIS region, Nissan sold Note with Comfort, Luxury and Tekna trim levels. Cars made for this market before 2009 have standard OBDII diagnostics especially software disabled by Nissan.

Japanese version

European version

Safety 
The 2006 Nissan Note, 1.4 Acenta (SE), five-door hatchback passed, July 2006, passed the Euro NCAP car safety tests with these ratings:
Adult occupant = 
Pedestrian =

Production 
Production of European model of Nissan Note began in January 2006 at Sunderland plant in the UK.

Nissan Note was produced in Nissan's Oppama Plant.

Marketing 
A CD single called 'C'mon Everybody Note&Pencils' was released by Pony Canyon on 9 August 2006, which included Eddie Cochran's C'mon Everybody (original, DJ UTO remix, instrumental) used in the Nissan Note commercial premiered on 12 May 2006. The CD cover shows a Marine Blue Note 15S V package drawing on a 50m x 40m notebook with blue tire tracks. The Note commercial was performed by Toshihiro Yashiba of JFCT INC.

2007 facelift EU-made models
In 2007, Nissan slightly facelifted Note. Both bumpers become fully painted. Radio antenna moved to the rear of the roof. Headlamp washer lost its dedicated button and become fully automatic which lead to excessive cleaner fluid consumption. New radio models were offered and some less significant and invisible changes were made.

2008 update (only Japanese made models)

Nissan Note, +Plus navi HDD, Note Rider, Note Rider performance spec (2008–)

Changes to Nissan Note include:
redesigned head lamp, engine hood, front grille, front bumper  coloured/gun metallic front grille on G/X series models,smoke plated front grille on sporty series models,3 new colours (blue turquoise titan pearl metallic, frost green titan metallic, amethyst grey pearl metallic) for total of 10 body colour choices,new seat and door trim options sand beige, black, carbon black (with red stitching),sand beige interior includes colour scheme change,2-link meter (LCD odometer, trim trip meter with fuel consumption display) as standard equipment,sporty series (15RX/15RS) includes white meter,dimpled leather-wrapped 3-spoke steering wheel with red stitching (standard in 15RX),rear centre arm rest with 2 cup holders (standard in 15G, 15G FOUR, 15RX) water spray seats (standard in 15G, 15G FOUR),cold terrain vehicles include 4-wheel drive as standard equipment,driver seat seat belt reminder as standard equipment,2-wheel drive models with HR15DE engine and Xtronic CVT transmission passed JC08 model fuel consumption and emission tests.

Japanese models went on sale on 16 January 2008. Early models include 15X F package, 15X, 15G, 15RS, 15RX, 15X FOUR F package, 15X FOUR, 15G FOUR.

European model was unveiled at the 2008 Paris Motor Show. The 1.5-litre dCi engine models went on sale in September 2008, followed by 1.4-litre petrol engine models in October 2008.

2010 Nissan Note update (EU made models only)
European second facelift/restyle models went on sale in the late 2010 as 2011 model year vehicles. As for early models Nissan provided choice of 3 engines (1.5-litre dCi turbo diesel engine (N/A in CIS/Russia), 1.4-litre with 65 kW (88 hp) and a 1.6-litre with 81 kW (110 hp) petrol), choice of 10 body colours (a metallic red and a metallic grey - added to replace three outgoing colours; two solid colours and 8 metallics).
On second facelift many changes were made in exterior and interior. Lights, bumpers, grille and dashboard were significantly changed. Nissan Connect Radio/Navi offered as option for high trim levels. AT software was tuned to stay on the safe side while ATF is not warm enough. There are variety of less significant changes.

Nissan Note 15X SV +Plasma, 15X FOUR SV +Plasma (2011-2012 Japanese made models only)
They are versions of Nissan Note 15X SV and 15X FOUR SV for the Japanese market, with intelligent air conditioning system with 1-touch clean switch.

The vehicles went on sale on 30 June 2011.

Autech Note Rider Blackline (2011-2012 Japanese made models only)
It is a version of the Nissan Note Rider 15X SV (2WD 1.5L) and 15X FOUR SV (e･4WD 1.5L) for the Japanese market, with exclusive dark chrome front grille, dark chrome bumper grille, exclusive dark emblem (Rider/AUTECH), intelligent air conditioning system, exclusive sports muffler (by FUJITSUBO) and exclusive pumper finisher (from Note Rider Autech option), choice of 2 body colors (white pearl (3 coat pearl), super black (pearl)).

The vehicles went on sale on 19 October 2011.

Marketing
As part of the 2008 Nissan Note launch in Japan, a series of television commercials based on The World of GOLDEN EGGS characters was produced. The corresponding web site <http://note-notte.com/> opened on 21 December 2007, followed by the 1st television commercial premiere in January 2008, and the opening of a special Nissan Note web site with The World of GOLDEN EGGS characters.

As part of the 2009 Nissan Note market launch in Japan, a series of animated commercials were premiered on 20 May 2009. The commercial was inspired by the Heidi, Girl of the Alps animated series, featuring Junichi Koumoto and Tomochika (as Heidi). The series was produced by studio crocodile inc.

2012 update (EU models only)
UK models included:
Acenta model includes new 'diamond cut' two-tone 16-inch alloy wheels, replacing the original 15-inch units, Colour coded door mirror covers, chrome front fog light surrounds, new seat fabric with blue stitching, climate control, automatic headlights, rain-sensitive wipers became standard equipment,N-TEC model includes darkened rear privacy glass, touch screen 'Connect' satellite navigation system. N-TEC+ model includes rear parking sensors, choice of 1.4, 1.6 petrol and 1.5 dCi engines.

UK models went on sale in February 2012.
Since beginning of 2012 and till the end of E11 production in 2013 at least in Russian marketed models/trims Nissan silently excluded seat belt pretensioners without any prior notes. Furthermore, seat belt pretensioners was listed in all the dealer offers and contracts while some people found no installed pretensioners on their places upon seat dismount. Later NM Russia acknowledged the lack of pretensioners in Nissan Note 2012–2013.

Nissan Connect
Nissan Connect is an auto entertainment system offered with many Nissan cars. There are a few different models of NC for different cars. It is an inexpensive CD/USB audio player with a built-in 4-channel amplifier, 5" LCD, resistive touchscreen and GPS receiver. The only navigation software is built into the firmware. No user apps could be installed on the device. Maps could only be updated using Nissan DRM protected SD cards ($150+). Cellular communications are not supported by hardware. Audio/amplifier quality can be assumed as acceptable. System was developed by Bosch Portugal as stated on stickers and is Linux based. Sources of firmware were not published which does definitely violate Linux open source license.

Production
, Nissan has sold 940,000 units of Nissan Note.

Note inspired by adidas (2005) 
It is a version of the Nissan Note inspired by multi-sports brand adidas, with user-changeable treatment on the front/rear bumpers; fabrics and rubber materials used on dashboard, door trim, etc.

The vehicle was unveiled at the 2005 Tokyo Motor Show.

Autech Note Rider (2006) 
The vehicle was unveiled at the 2006 Tokyo Auto Salon.

Second generation (E12; 2012)

Invitation Concept
Showcased in 2012 at the 82nd Geneva Motor Show, the Invitation Concept is a hatchback concept built on the V platform, designed to be sold alongside Nissan Micra and Nissan Juke. It featured a swage line at the side body panel, independent front MacPherson struts with coil springs, torsion beam rear axle, Around View Monitor (AVM) safety technology, Nissan Safety Shield System.

Initial release

The second generation Nissan Note was based on the Nissan INVITATION concept.

The vehicle was unveiled at the Osanbashi venue in Yokohama, followed by Nissan Gallery on 28 August 2012.

The European model was unveiled at the 83rd Geneva Motor Show.

The Latin American model was unveiled at the Port of Cartagena de Indias in Colombia.

It would replace the Nissan Livina for other countries' markets (except China and parts of Asia) within 2013.

Japanese models went on sale on 3 September 2012. Early Note models include a choice of HR12DE (S, X, X FOUR) and HR12DDR (S DIG-S, X DIG-S, MEDALIST) engines, Xtronic CVT transmission. Early Note Rider models include a choice of HR12DE (X, X FOUR) and HR12DDR (X DIG-S) engines, Xtronic CVT transmission. The width dimension is kept under 1700mm on all international models so that versions in Japan will be in compliance with Japanese Government dimension regulations with engine displacement kept under 2000cc so that Japanese versions will offer Japanese buyers annual road tax savings for smaller engines.

Hong Kong models went on sale on 21 September 2012. Early models included DIG-S with HR12DDR engine, XTRONIC CVT transmission, ISS idle mode.

Latin American models went on sale in July 2013. Early models included Sense (manual and CVT) and Advance (manual and CVT).

European models went on sale in summer 2013, with deliveries beginning in autumn 2013. Early models include a choice of 3 engines (1.2-litre 80PS petrol, 1.2-litre 98PS DIG-S petrol, 1.5-litre 90PS turbo diesel), manual or CVT transmission, 3 trim levels (Visia, Acenta and Tekna).

Nissan said the drag coefficient is 0.298. The frontal area is 2.13 m2, making the drag area CdA to be at 0.639 m2.

Note Medalist
It is a version of the Nissan Note for the Japanese market, with plated door handles, exclusive Beatnic Gold body color, suede-like cloth seats and artificial leather, piano-like center cluster finisher and genuine leather-wrapped steering wheel. The highest grade "MEDALIST" is also a model that inherits the concept of Tidus and comes from Laurel's grade of the same name.

Versa Note (2013–2019)

The Versa Note is a version of the Note for the US market, as a replacement of the outgoing Versa hatchback.

The vehicle was unveiled at the 2013 North American International Auto Show.

US model went on sale in mid-2013 as 2014 model year vehicle. Early models include 1.6-liter DOHC 4-cylinder engine with dual fuel injection and Twin CVTC (Continuously Variable Timing Control), 5-speed manual or Xtronic CVT transmission, 5 grade levels (S, S Plus, SV, SL). A sporty SR model has been added to the 2015 lineup. New for 2017 a facelift with a new front bumper cover as well as rear (previously only available on the SR model), wheels and color choices.

Nissan discontinued the Versa Note in late 2019, while the Versa sedan continued to be offered for the 2020 model year onwards.

Engines

Production
The Japanese model of Nissan Note is manufactured at Nissan Motor Kyushu, while European models of Nissan Note were developed at Nissan Technical Centre Europe (NTCE) in both the UK and Spain and produced in Nissan Manufacturing UK in Sunderland.

Both the North American Nissan Versa Note and Latin American models of the Nissan Note are built in Nissan Mexicana SA de CV in Aguascalientes, Mexico.

, Japanese dealers have received 21,880 market orders of Nissan Note.

Marketing
As part of Nissan Note's market launch in Japan, Nissan Note's Japan website featured a flip book animation.

DRLs
Nissan Note uses PS19W DRLs in Argentine and European models.

2014 model year update

Nissan Note, Emergency Brake Package, Note MEDALIST, Autech Note AXIS, Autech Note Rider (Black Line), Driver Seat Mighty Grip (2013-)

Changes include:
HR12DDR and HR12DE engines include  emission reduction,Addition of Emergency Brake Package (Emergency Brake, Lane Departure Warning (LDW), VDC, Emergency Assist for Pedal Misapplication (optional)).,Addition of Moving object detection for Around View Monitor (optional in X, X DIG-S, X FOUR, X FOUR Aero Style, X Emergency Brake Package, X FOUR Aero Style Emergency Brake Package),Super UV-blocking green glass (standard in all but S, S DIG-S),standard rear centre seat headrest

The vehicle was unveiled at the 43rd Tokyo Motor Show in 2013.

Japanese model went on sale on 25 December 2013.

Engines

On 24 October 2016, Renault-Nissan CEO Carlos Ghosn revealed at the Nissan Note factory in Japan the facelifted MY2017 Note model, with a special powertrain called e-Power. It uses only an electric motor to move the car, while a petrol engine is used as a generator producing electricity that goes directly into propelling the electric motor or, when electricity is in excess, to charge the batteries (similar to BMW's REX).

2017 model year update – e-Power 
Nissan unveiled a new hybrid powertrain in Note e-Power on 2 November 2016 in Japan.

The company's new e-Power series hybrid system consists of a small 1.2-liter, three-cylinder gasoline engine (HR12DE) and an electric traction motor (EM57), which is shared with the Nissan Leaf, pairs with a much smaller battery (1.5 kWh) than the Leaf's. Unlike typical power-split parallel hybrid vehicles, in the series hybrid scheme, the small engine only charges the battery, and the electric motor is the sole source of traction with no plug-in capability.

As of 2017, the Nissan Note is being sold only in Asia and Americas. UK production for European and Argentine markets ended in March that year to increase capacity for Qashqai.

Third generation (E13; 2020) 

The third-generation Note was revealed in Japan on 24 November 2020 and went on sale on 23 December 2020. It is based on the CMF-B platform. For this generation, the Note is only available with an e-Power series hybrid 2WD or 4WD drivetrain (introduced later in 2021), in which one electric motor powering the front axle and another motor powering the rear axle.

Japanese models went on sale in December 2020. Initial models included the e-Power, followed by e-Power AWD in 2021.

Note Aura
An upmarket version called the Note Aura was introduced and went on sale in June 2021. Initial models include G, G leather edition, G Four, G Four leather edition.

Note Autech Crossover
The Note Autech Crossover went on sale in October 2021 in Japan. It is a version of the Note with crossover body, with exclusive blue signature LEDs, metal-finish door mirrors, 25 mm of increased ground clearance via retuned suspension and larger diameter tyres. Initial grades include X and X Four.

Powertrain

Reception 
In 2013, the Note won the RJC Car of the Year award, beating out the Suzuki Wagon R and the Mazda CX-5. Five years later, it became the top-selling compact car in Japan for 2018 and won the Japanese environmental award on the same year.

References

External links 

 

Note
Cars introduced in 2004
2010s cars
2020s cars
Mini MPVs
Hatchbacks
Front-wheel-drive vehicles
All-wheel-drive vehicles
Hybrid electric cars
Partial zero-emissions vehicles
Production electric cars
Euro NCAP superminis
Vehicles with CVT transmission